The Soy Tour was the second headlining concert tour by Argentine singer Lali, in support of her second studio album, Soy (2016). The tour began on September 8, 2016 in Buenos Aires at the Opera Allianz Theatre and ended on June 17, 2017, in Santiago at Teatro Teletón.

Background
Espósito confirmed plans of a tour in support of the album via previous live chats and TV interviews. On May 27, 2016, Espósito released the first dates of the tour, beginning on September 8, 2016. Soy Tour, which is the follow-up of Espósito's previous A Bailar Tour, included dates across Latin America, Europe and Israel.

Before and while touring, the singer embarked on a promotional tour across various cities of Latin America, Italy, Puerto Rico, Spain, the United States. Espósito performed live several times across 2016, including performances at the 2016 Radio Disney Vivo music festival in Buenos Aires, the 2016 Coca-Cola.FM festival in Mexico City along with Mexican boy-band CD9, the 2016 Coca-Cola Music Experience On The Beach at El Campello, Spain in front of 30,000 people, and as the opening act of Fifth Harmony's The 7/27 Tour in Santiago.

The first leg of the tour visited twenty-one cities across South America beginning on September 8, 2016 in Buenos Aires , Argentina and concluding on December 6, 2016 in Montevideo, Uruguay. In November 2016, Espósito performed as the opening act for Ricky Martin's One World Tour at the Monterrey Arena in Monterrey, the Telmex Auditorium in Guadalajara and the National Auditorium in Mexico City. Days after, the singer travelled to Italy, where she gave away two showcases or "fan events" at the RDS Auditorium in Rome and 55 Milano in Milan.

The second leg of the tour consisted of a series of performances in festivals, including the one of February 25, 2017 at the 58th Viña del Mar International Song Festival in Viña del Mar, Chile. This leg of the tour visited eight cities, starting on January 10, 2017 in Punta del Este, Uruguay, and concluding on March 10, 2017 in Dolores, Argentina.

The European leg of the tour was announced on December 20, 2016, which started on April 4, 2017 in Madrid, Spain and concluded on April 13, 2017 in Tel Aviv, Israel. This leg of the tour was promoted by Live Nation, Sold Out and Yair Dori. On March 30, 2017, Espósito confirmed the continuity of the South American leg of the tour, which started on April 29, 2017 in Colón, Argentina, and finished on June 17, 2017 in Santiago, Chile.

Production
The big screen is described as the protagonist of the show from the very beginning. There, different types of images are projected and it carries the audience to a virtual tour for absolutely all the songs. In the videos, close-ups of Espósito predominate, especially to her mouth and eyes, but also her getting ready for the show, graffitis, song lyrics and even her excited fans to tears and jumping for joy during old shows of the teen-idol.

The show's production also includes different light sets to create different atmospheres in each act, every color laserlights, projections over the audience, special effects, confetti, a floating luminous sphere and a DJ booth, and ten different costumes.

Concert synopsis
The show begins with a video introduction of the singer. Immediately, the screens splits with Espósito landing on stage in a luminous sphere while performing the first chords of  the opening number, "Soy". She then continues with the popular tracks, "Irresistible" and "Asesina". It is here that she not only sings but she also plays the guitar and shows her rockier side. After a music interlude, and accompanied by her entourage, 8 musicians and 10 dancers, the show continues with "Boomerang" and "Tu Revolución" and leaves the stage. Espósito comes back to the stage to perform a medley of ballads from her previous record A Bailar which includes "Del Otro Lado", "Cielo Salvador" and "Desamor".  The ballad act continues as the singer performs "Cree en Mí", creating an intimate atmosphere dominated by red and yellow lights, in which Espósito deploys all her glamor wearing a long dress, with transparencies and brightnesses.

The next songs to be performed are "Bomba", in which twerking predominates as dance style, and "Mi Religión", while Espósito descends from the ceiling by commanding a DJ console surrounded by lights, smoke and special effects, which is described as "a 100% energetic moment that brings everyone to their feet for a party-like atmosphere". To accompany the song "Lejos de Mí", Espósito brings together in a video to several of her friends, included the actresses Leticia Siciliani, María del Cerro, Marina Bellati and Justina Bustos. The heat slows down as Espósito performs "Reina", "Ego" and "Amor Es Presente", in the last one accompanied by a gospel choir.

Towards the end of the show, Espósito once again comes back to the stage wearing a pink leather crop top, skirt and boots to perform "Unico", "A Bailar" and "Mil Años Luz". The last act includes the songs "No Estoy Sola", "Histeria" and "Ring Na Na". Espósito ends the show thanking the public while confetti falls from the ceiling.

Commercial performance
On September 1, 2016, a week before the start of the tour, it was announced that the first four shows at the Opera Allianz Theatre were all sold out, making it the third highest-grossing tour of the week in Buenos Aires. Other sold out dates included the shows in La Plata, Santiago del Estero, Montevideo, Punta del Este and Viña del Mar. However, the ticket sales for the shows in Mendoza, La Rioja and Toay were not as successful as the mentioned before. As of March 2017, it is estimated that 380,000 have attended the tour.

Setlist
This set list is representative of the show on October 27, 2016 in La Plata, Argentina. It is not representative of all concerts for the duration of the tour.

 "Soy"
 "Irresistible"
 "Asesina"
 "Del Otro Lado"
 "Cree en Mí"
 "Boomerang"
 "Tu Revolución"
 "Bomba"
 "Mi Religión"
 "Lejos de Mí"
 "Reina"
 "Ego"
 "Amor Es Presente"
 "Unico"
 "A Bailar"
 "Mil Años Luz"
 "No Estoy Sola"
 "Histeria"
 "Ring Na Na"

Shows

Box office score data

Cancelled and rescheduled shows

Changes of venue

Notes

References

Lali Espósito concert tours
2016 concert tours
2017 concert tours